The 2013–14 Indiana Hoosiers women's basketball team represented Indiana University Bloomington during the 2013–14 NCAA Division I women's basketball season. The Hoosiers, led by second year head coach Curt Miller, play their home games at Assembly Hall and are members of the Big Ten Conference. They finished the season of 21–13 overall, 5–11 in Big Ten play for a tie for an eighth-place finish. They lost in the first round of the 2014 Big Ten Conference women's basketball tournament to Michigan. They were invited to the 2014 Women's National Invitation Tournament which they defeated Belmont in the first round, Marquette in the second round, Northwestern in the third round before losing to South Dakota State in the quarterfinals.

Roster

Schedule

|-
!colspan=9| Exhibition

|-
!colspan=9| Regular Season

|-
!colspan=9| 2014 Big Ten Conference women's basketball tournament

|-
!colspan=9| 2014 WNIT

Source

See also
2013–14 Indiana Hoosiers men's basketball team

References

Indiana Hoosiers women's basketball seasons
Indiana
2014 Women's National Invitation Tournament participants
Indiana Hoosiers
Indiana Hoosiers